Annie Gorassini (born 8 January 1941 in Milan) is an Italian actress and singer, originally a participant in the 1957 Miss World beauty pageant, she went on to star in Messalina (1960), Vulcan, Son of Giove (1962), 8½ (1963), and Stop Train 349 (1963). She also sang in the Zecchino d'Oro competition in 1972.

References 

1941 births
Living people
Italian actresses
Italian singers